Arganasaurus is an extinct genus of prehistoric temnospondyl amphibian belonging to the family Metoposauridae that lived in Morocco during the Late Triassic (Carnian).

Taxonomy
The type species of Arganasaurus, A. lyazidi, was originally described as Metoposaurus lyazidi by Dutuit (1976) on the basis of skulls found in the Argana Formation of northern Morocco. Hunt (1993) found the species generically distinct from the Metoposaurus type species to warrant its own genus, which he named Arganasaurus.

The nominal species "Metoposaurus" azerouali Dutuit, 1976, treated as a nomen dubium by Hunt (1993), was referred to Arganasaurus by Buffa et al. (2019).

Habitat
Arganasaurus is one of two metoposaurids that inhabited the Argana Basin in the Late Triassic, the other being Dutuitosaurus. Tetrapods living alongside the two metoposaurids included the allokotosaur Azendohsaurus laaroussi, the phytosaurs Arganarhinus and Moroccorhinus, the silesaurid Diodorus, the stahleckeriid Moghreberia, and the rauisuchid Arganasuchus.

See also
 Prehistoric amphibian
 List of prehistoric amphibians

References

Stereospondyls